The University of Rochester (U of R, UR, or U of Rochester) is a private research university in Rochester, New York. The university grants undergraduate and graduate degrees, including doctoral and professional degrees.

The University of Rochester enrolls approximately 6,800 undergraduates and 5,000 graduate students. Its 158 buildings house over 200 academic majors. According to the National Science Foundation, Rochester spent more than $397 million on research and development in 2020, ranking it 66th in the nation. With approximately 28,000 full-time employees, the university is the largest private employer in Upstate New York and the 7th largest in all of New York State.

The College of Arts, Sciences, and Engineering is home to departments and divisions of note. The Institute of Optics was founded in 1929 through a grant from Eastman Kodak and Bausch and Lomb as the first educational program in the US devoted exclusively to optics, awards approximately half of all optics degrees nationwide, and is widely regarded as the premier optics program in the nation, and among the best in the world. The Departments of Political Science and Economics have made a significant and consistent impact on positivist social science since the 1960s, and historically rank in the top 5 in their fields. The Department of Chemistry is noted for its contributions to synthetic organic chemistry, including the first lab-based synthesis of morphine. The Rossell Hope Robbins Library serves as the university's resource for Old and Middle English texts and expertise. The university is also home to Rochester's Laboratory for Laser Energetics, a national laboratory supported by the US Department of Energy.

The University of Rochester's Eastman School of Music ranks first among undergraduate music schools in the U.S. The Sibley Music Library at Eastman is the largest academic music library in North America and holds the third largest collection in the United States.

In its history, university alumni and faculty have earned 13 Nobel Prizes, 13 Pulitzer Prizes, 45 Grammy Awards, 20 Guggenheim Fellowships, 9 National Medals of Science, 4 National Medals of Technology, 3 National Medals of Arts, and 3 National Humanities Medals, while others have been elected to the National Academies of Sciences, Engineering, and Medicine, the American Academy of Arts and Sciences, the National Academy of Inventors, and the National Inventors Hall of Fame.

History

Early history 
The University of Rochester traces its origins to The First Baptist Church of Hamilton (New York), which was founded in 1796. The church established the Baptist Education Society of the State of New York, later renamed the Hamilton Literary and Theological Institution, in 1817. This institution gave birth to both Colgate University and the University of Rochester. Its function was to train clergy in the Baptist tradition. When it aspired to grant higher degrees, it created a collegiate division separate from the theological division.
 
The collegiate division was granted a charter by the State of New York in 1846, after which its name was changed to Madison University. John Wilder and the Baptist Education Society urged that the new university be moved to Rochester, New York. However, legal action prevented the move. In response, dissenting What was the dissent about? faculty, students, and trustees defected and departed for Rochester, where they sought a new charter for a new university.

Madison University was eventually renamed Colgate University.

Founding 
Asahel C. Kendrick, professor of Greek, was among the faculty that departed Madison University for Rochester. Kendrick served as acting president while a national search was conducted. He reprised this role until 1853, when Martin Brewer Anderson of the Newton Theological Seminary in Massachusetts was selected to fill the inaugural posting.

The University of Rochester's new charter was awarded by the Regents of the State of New York on January 31, 1850. The charter stipulated that the university have $100,000 in endowment within five years, upon which the charter would be reaffirmed. An initial gift of $10,000 was pledged by John Wilder, which helped catalyze significant gifts from individuals and institutions.

Classes began that November, with approximately 60 students enrolled, including 28 transfers from Madison. From 1850 to 1862, the university was housed in the old United States Hotel in downtown Rochester on Buffalo Street near Elizabeth Street, today, West Main Street near the I-490 overpass. On a February 1851 visit, Ralph Waldo Emerson said of the university:'They had bought a hotel, once a railroad terminus depot, for $8,500, turned the dining room into a chapel by putting up a pulpit on one side, made the barroom into a Pythologian Society's Hall, & the chambers into Recitation rooms, Libraries, & professors' apartments, all for $700 a year. They had brought an omnibus load of professors down from Madison bag and baggage... called in a painter and sent him up the ladder to paint the title "University of Rochester" on the wall, and they had runners on the road to catch students. And they are confident of graduating a class of ten by the time green peas are ripe.''For the next 10 years, the college expanded its scope and secured its future through an expanding endowment, student body, and faculty. In parallel, a gift of 8 acres of farmland from local businessman and Congressman Azariah Boody secured the first campus of the university, upon which Anderson Hall was constructed and dedicated in 1862. Over the next sixty years, this Prince Street Campus grew by a further 17 acres and was developed to include fraternities houses, dormitories, and academic buildings including Anderson Hall, Sibley Library, Eastman and Carnegie Laboratories, the Memorial Art Gallery, and Cutler Union.

Twentieth century

Coeducation 
The first female students were admitted in 1900, the result of an effort led by Susan B. Anthony and Helen Barrett Montgomery. During the 1890s, a number of women took classes and labs at the university as "visitors" but were not officially enrolled nor were their records included in the college register. President David Jayne Hill allowed the first woman, Helen E. Wilkinson, to enroll as a normal student, although she was not allowed to matriculate or pursue a degree. Thirty-three women enrolled among the first class in 1900, and Ella S. Wilcoxen was the first to receive a degree, in 1901. The first female member of the faculty was Elizabeth Denio who retired as Professor Emeritus in 1917. Male students moved to River Campus upon its completion in 1930 while the female students remained on the Prince Street campus until 1955.

Expansion 

Major growth occurred under the leadership of Benjamin Rush Rhees over his 1900-1935 tenure. During this period, George Eastman became a major donor, giving more than $50 million to the university during his life. Under the patronage of Eastman, the Eastman School of Music was created in 1921. In 1925, at the behest of the General Education Board and with significant support for John D. Rockefeller, George Eastman, and Henry A. Strong's family, medical and dental schools were created. The university award its first PhD that same year.

During World War II, Rochester was one of 131 colleges and universities nationally that took part in the V-12 Navy College Training Program which offered students a path to a Navy commission.
In 1942, the university was invited to join the Association of American Universities as an affiliate member and it was made a full member by 1944. Between 1946 and 1947, in infamous uranium experiments researchers at the university injected uranium-234 and uranium-235 into six people to study how much uranium their kidneys could tolerate before becoming damaged.

In 1955, the separate colleges for men and women were merged into the college on the River Campus. In 1958, three new schools were created in engineering, business administration, and education. The Graduate School of Management was named after William E. Simon, former Secretary of the Treasury in 1986. He committed significant funds to the school because of his belief in the school's free market philosophy and grounding in economic analysis.

Financial decline and name change controversy
Following the princely gifts given throughout his life, George Eastman left the entirety of his estate to the university after his death by suicide. The total of these gifts surpassed $100 million, before inflation, and, as such, Rochester enjoyed a privileged position amongst the most well-endowed universities. During the expansion years between 1936 and 1976, the University of Rochester's financial position ranked third, near Harvard University's endowment and the University of Texas System's Permanent University Fund. Due to a decline in the value of large investments and a lack of portfolio diversity, the university's place dropped to the top 25 by the end of the 1980s. At the same time, the preeminence of the city of Rochester's major employers began to decline.

In response, the university commissioned a study to determine if the name of the institution should be changed to "Eastman University" or "Eastman Rochester University". The study concluded a name change could be beneficial because the use of a place name in the title led respondents to incorrectly believe it was a public university, and because the name "Rochester" connoted a "cold and distant outpost." Reports of the latter conclusion led to controversy and criticism in the Rochester community. Ultimately, the name "University of Rochester" was retained.

Renaissance Plan 
In 1995, university president Thomas H. Jackson announced the launch of a "Renaissance Plan" for the college that reduced enrollment from 4,500 to 3,600, creating a more selective admissions process. The plan also revised the undergraduate curriculum significantly, creating the current system with only one required course and only a few distribution requirements, known as clusters. Part of this plan called for the end of graduate doctoral studies in chemical engineering, comparative literature, linguistics, and mathematics, the last of which was met by national outcry. The plan was largely scrapped and mathematics exists as a graduate course of study to this day.

Twenty-first century

Meliora Challenge 
Shortly after taking office, university president Joel Seligman commenced the private phase of the Meliora Challenge, a $1.2 billion capital campaign, in 2005. The campaign reached its goal in 2015, a year before the campaign was slated to conclude. In 2016, the university announced the Meliora Challenge had exceeded its goal and surpassed $1.36 billion. These funds were allocated to support over 100 new endowed faculty positions and nearly 400 new scholarships.

Equal Employment Opportunity Commission complaint and related legal matters
On September 1, 2017, a complaint was filed by eight current and former faculty members at the University of Rochester with the United States Equal Employment Opportunity Commission (EEOC). The complaint includes allegations of sexual misconduct/harassment by a tenure track faculty member, and condemnation of the response of the university administration. The university's initial public response to the complaint was a claim that the allegations were thoroughly investigated and could not be substantiated. Later, the university's board of trustees announced a new, independent investigation into the allegations. The investigation found the individuals covered in the report had not violated policy; however, significant recommendations were made to push the university towards leadership in policy regarding relationships between faculty, staff, employees, and students.

On the same day as the release of the report, university president Joel Seligman publicly announced his previously tendered resignation. Board chair Danny Wegman accepted the resignation and tapped Richard Feldman, Professor of Philosophy and previous Dean of the college, to serve as interim president.

On December 8, 2017, nine plaintiffs in the 2017 EEOC complaint filed a lawsuit with an attorney Ann Olivarius against the university and two university employees in the U.S. District Court for the Western District of New York (Case No: 6:17-cv-06847, Aslin et al. v. University of Rochester et al.). Allegations in the lawsuit include a number of the matters raised by plaintiffs in the EEOC complaint. The plaintiffs seek "damages in an amount not yet quantified but to be proven at trial, for costs and attorneys’ fees, and for any other and further relief which is just and proper." After Lawrence Vilardo, the federal judge hearing the case, upheld the legal validity, in whole or in part, of 16 of the 17 claims in the lawsuit, the parties in March 2020 agreed to a settlement in which the University of Rochester paid $9.4 million to the plaintiffs, with the plaintiff Jessica Cantlon (now of Carnegie Mellon University) writing, "We consider it a major victory for all of the faculty and students who were harassed," and "[the settlement is] going to have a really powerful impact on how seriously universities take women who come forward with complaints of sexual harassment. This is something that universities will notice."

The Mangelsdorf Years 

On December 17, 2018, the University of Rochester announced that Sarah C. Mangelsdorf would succeed Richard Feldman as President of the university. Her term started in July 2019, with a formal inauguration following in October during Meliora Weekend. Mangelsdorf is the first woman to serve as President of the university, and the first person with a degree in psychology to be appointed to Rochester's highest office.

In 2019 students from China mobilized by the Chinese Students and Scholars Association, defaced murals in the university's access tunnels which had expressed support for the 2019 Hong Kong Protests, condemned the oppression of the Uighurs and advocated for Taiwanese independence. In one news article, the act was described as a continuation of overseas censorship of Chinese issues. In response a large group of students recreated the original murals, there were also calls for the Chinese Students and Scholars Association to be banned from campus.

Administration

The university is headed by a Board of Trustees, with Richard B. Handler as the chairman. The Board appoints the president of the university. As of 2018, ten people have held the role of regularly-appointed president, with the eleventh to be inaugurated in 2019. On four occasions, the Board of Trustees has called upon members of the faculty to serve as president during periods of transition.

Campuses

River Campus 
It is bounded by Bausch & Lomb Riverside Park, an  public park along the east bank of the Genesee River formerly known as the Olmstead River Walk, and Mount Hope Cemetery, where the grave sites of Susan B. Anthony and Frederick Douglass can be found. The River Campus was acquired in the late 1920s from the Oak Hill Country Club through a land swap deal orchestrated in part by Edwin Sage Hubbell and funded largely by George Eastman.

After a period of landscaping, grading, and construction, the original buildings of the campus were dedicated in 1930 when the first class of River Campus was welcomed to the Men's college. The main academic buildings are examples of the Greek Revival style in 20th-century collegiate architecture. The main buildings situated upon the Eastman Quadrangle are Rush Rhees Library at the head, flanked by the Morey Hall, Bausch & Lomb Hall, Lattimore Hall, and Dewey Hall. The Rush Rhees Library, the unofficial symbol of the university, is also home to the Hopeman Memorial Carillon, the largest carillon in New York State, featuring 50 bells that chime on the quarter-hour. During the summer, the carillon features a recital series in which various artists perform on the instrument. Just off the quadrangle, in parallel, are Strong Auditorium and the Simon School of Business with the Interfaith Chapel opposite the Library. A Marc Mellon bronze of George Eastman was placed on the quadrangle in 2009.

Over the last several decades, other academic buildings have been built south of the Eastman Quad, including Gavett Hall (dedicated to the Eastman Quad in 1930), Harkness Hall (1946), Hoyt Hall (1962), the Hopeman Engineering Building (1963), and Meliora Hall (1972). The southernmost part of the River Campus contains the new Science and Engineering Quadrangle: Wilmot Building (1961), Hylan Building (1971), Hutchison Hall (1972), the Computer Studies Building and Carlson Library (1987), the Robert B. Goergen Hall for Biomedical Engineering and Optics (2007), and Wegmans Hall for the Goergen Institute for Data Science (2017) and the department of Computer Science. LeChase Hall (2013) and the Ronald Rettner Hall for Media Arts and Innovation (2013) were added to the north of the Eastman Quad on the Wilson Quadrangle behind Lattimore Hall and Morey Hall, respectively.

Students often congregate outdoors during the warmer months on the various quads. Other centers of student life include Todd Union, Frederick Douglass Dining Center, various locations inside Rush Rhees Library, and Wilson Commons, a student union designed by the architectural firm of I.M. Pei. Many academic buildings, including Rush Rhees Library, are connected by a series of tunnels, which are used extensively, especially during unfavorable weather. All academic buildings and common areas, as well as residence halls, have authenticated Wi-Fi internet access.

River Campus is home to a number of student exhibition spaces. The AsIs Gallery in the Sage Art Center showcases rotating exhibitions of student works from studio classes at U of R. As a work-in-progress critique space, this exhibition space provides students the opportunity to develop their work in a semi-professional space. The Gallery at the Art and Music Library features work from students and local artists in the highly trafficked Rush Rhees Art and Music Library. Hartnett Gallery, in Wilson Commons, is a student-supported gallery that showcases international and professional contemporary artists as well as an annual juried student exhibition. The pasSAGE is an annex of the Sage Art Center which features a long-term exhibition selected by a faculty committee. There is also a Senior Thesis Gallery in the Sage Arts Center that features senior undergraduate works.

Medical Campus

The University of Rochester Medical Center (URMC) is the primary campus for the university's medical education and research as well as the main patient care facility. The Medical Center is next to the River Campus and is dominated by Strong Memorial Hospital, the School of Medicine and Dentistry building, and the Arthur Kornberg Medical Research Building. URMC also houses the School of Nursing and a variety of research centers, including the Wilmot Cancer Center, the Aab Institute of Biomedical Sciences, and the Clinical and Translational Sciences Institute.

The Eastman School of Music 
The Eastman School of Music is situated on its own campus in downtown Rochester, which includes a residence for students, classroom and performance facilities, and the Eastman Theatre, a 2,326-seat concert hall which also serves as the primary venue of the Rochester Philharmonic Orchestra. The campus also features the Sibley Music Library, which is the largest academic music library in North America, as well as the largest privately owned collection of sheet music. Students are housed at 100 Gibbs Street, a dormitory building constructed in 1991.

South Campus 
The South Campus is in Brighton, immediately south of Rochester proper. The campus includes the Laboratory for Laser Energetics, a Department of Energy-funded national lab, the Center for Optics Manufacturing, the Center for Optoelectronics and Imaging, and the now-defunct Nuclear Structure Research Laboratory (NSRL). Graduate student housing is also provided at the Whipple Park complex.

Mount Hope Campus 
The Mount Hope Campus consists of a number of old mansion homes including the Witmer Family House, which serves as the official residence of the President of the university, and the Patrick Barry House, which serves as the official residence of the Provost of the university.

Bristol Mountain Observatory 
An observatory owned and operated by the university is named in honor of the scientist C. E. Kenneth Mees, university professor and Eastman Kodak scientist.

Prince Street Campus and Memorial Art Gallery

The university's first permanent campus was at the former farm of Azariah Boody. While a number of buildings still stand including Anderson Hall, the Eastman Laboratories, and a number of student dormitories, these buildings have been absorbed by private companies or the Rochester School of the Arts. The university retains control of a few acres of land including the land under the Sibley Library (razed), old campus gates, the Memorial Art Gallery's old and new wings, and the Cutler Union, a prime example of the Collegiate Gothic style of 20th-century architecture.

The Memorial Art Gallery was founded in 1913 as a part of the University of Rochester through a gift from Emily Sibley Watson as a memorial to her son, James George Averell. It was designed by the prominent American architectural firm McKim, Mead, and White and occupies the southern half of the university's Prince Street campus. It is the focal point of fine arts activity in the region and hosts the biennial Rochester-Finger Lakes Exhibition and the annual Clothesline Festival.

Academics

The University of Rochester's undergraduate enrollment includes approximately 5,800 full-time and about 200 part-time students from across the U.S. and over 115 countries. Graduate enrollment includes approximately 3,900 full-time and about 1,100 part-time graduate students.
The university has more than 103,000 living alumni and employs nearly 2,300 tenure-track faculty, with more than 20,000 faculty and staff across the university and the Strong Health System.

The only required undergraduate course is the first-year writing seminar. In lieu of a core curriculum, undergraduates complete coursework in each of three disciplines: humanities, social sciences, and natural sciences. Students choose a major, consisting of more than ten courses, and a cluster, consisting of three related courses. The student must ensure at least a cluster is met in each discipline; however, second majors and minors are often used to fulfill these requirements. Students who pursue accredited engineering fields including biomedical engineering, chemical engineering, electrical and computer engineering or mechanical engineering, are exempt from this system and are only required to have one humanities or social science cluster.

Rochester offers juniors and seniors the opportunity to apply for full funding for the fifth year of study. These programs include the Take Five Scholars program and the Kauffman Entrepreneurial Year (KEY) Scholarship. "Take-Five" and "Key", as they are colloquially known, allow for study in a field unrelated to an undergraduate major or the pursuit of an innovative entrepreneurial project with an impact on the local area, respectively.

The university further offers a number of combined undergraduate - graduate tracks. These include Rochester Early Medical Scholars (REMS), Rochester Early Business Scholar (REBS), Graduate Engineering At Rochester (GEAR), and Guaranteed Rochester Accelerated Degree in Education (GRADE) programs. These programs are open to prospective students, who must apply for these prior to entering the university.

Rankings

UR was one of the 25 New Ivies in the 2007 Kaplan/Newsweek "How to Get into College Guide." The list names institutions whose caliber of students is considered to rival traditional Ivy League schools. The rankings are based on admissions statistics as well as interviews with administrators, students, faculty, and alumni.

UR is ranked 34th among national universities and 140th among global universities by U.S. News & World Report.

The Eastman School of Music ranks first among music schools in the U.S.

Research
Rochester is a member of the Association of American Universities and is classified among "R1: Doctoral Universities – Very High Research Activity". Rochester had a research expenditure of $397 million in 2020. In 2008, Rochester ranked 44th nationally in research spending, but this ranking has declined gradually to 66 in 2020. Some of the major research centers include the Laboratory for Laser Energetics, a laser-based nuclear fusion facility, and the extensive research facilities at the University of Rochester Medical Center. Recently, the university has also engaged in a series of new initiatives to expand its programs in biomedical engineering and optics, including the construction of the new $37 million Robert B. Goergen Hall for Biomedical Engineering and Optics on the River Campus. Other new research initiatives include a cancer stem cell program and a Clinical and Translational Sciences Institute. UR also has the ninth highest technology revenue among U.S. higher education institutions, with $46 million being paid for commercial rights to university technology and research in 2009. Notable patents include Zoloft and Gardasil. WeBWorK, a web-based system for checking homework and providing immediate feedback for students, was developed by University of Rochester professors Gage and Pizer. The system is now in use at over 800 universities and colleges, as well as several secondary and primary schools. Rochester scientists work in diverse areas. For example, physicists developed a technique for etching metal surfaces, such as platinum, titanium, and brass, with powerful lasers, enabling self-cleaning surfaces that repel water droplets and will not rust if tilted at a 4-degree angle; and medical researchers are exploring how brains rid themselves of toxic waste during sleep.

Colleges and schools

College of Arts, Sciences, and Engineering - Undergraduate and graduate programs in a large number of fields. This is the largest college of the university by both undergraduate and graduate enrollment. The college is divided into two schools: The School of Arts and Sciences and the Hajim School of Engineering and Applied Sciences. The college is primarily on the River Campus.
The Eastman School of Music is a music conservatory offering both undergraduate and graduate education in a number of music fields, including composition, theory, and performance.
The Margaret Warner Graduate School of Education and Human Development is the university's graduate school of education. It is on the River Campus in LeChase Hall.
The School of Medicine and Dentistry is a medical and dental school with both research and clinical programs. The school of dentistry is known as the University of Rochester Eastman Institute for Oral Health. It is in the University of Rochester Medical Center.
The School of Nursing is a nursing school. It is also on the campus of the University of Rochester Medical Center.
Simon Business School is the graduate business school. It is on the River Campus.

Student life

UR's official symbol is the seal of the university, which features a book, representing arts and sciences, a lyre symbolizing music, and a modified symbol of medicine. The official flower of the university is the dandelion, purportedly prolific on the cow pasture that became the university's second campus.

The official mascot of the university is a predatory wasp found throughout Rochester, the Yellowjacket. From 1983 to 2008, the yellowjacket mascot was named "URBee." However, when the university re-designed the mascot during the 2007–2008 academic year, a new name was chosen. As of February 1, 2008, the school's mascot is now known as "Rocky".

The university uses Dandelion Yellow and Rochester Blue as its official colors, which are the prominent colors on the official regalia.

The motto of UR is Meliora, which loosely translates to "better" with the connotation of "ever better," the meaning adopted by the university.

The image of Rush Rhees Library's main dome serves as an additional icon for the University of Rochester. Rush Rhees Library at The University of Rochester was featured on the cover of the "Princeton Review 373 Best Colleges 2011 Edition".

The song most often sung at college events, led often by the school's many a cappella groups, is The Genesee, written by former Rochester student Thomas Thackeray Swinburne (Class of 1892). Although less frequently used, the university also has an official Alma Mater, The Dandelion Yellow.

Student organizations
The student body at the University of Rochester is both ethnically and socioeconomically diverse. There are over 200 active Students' Association recognized groups on campus, which range from cultural dance groups to U of R's comedy improv troupe In Between the Lines. Since 1873, the university has regularly printed its student newspaper, the Campus Times. There is also the student-run, online-only publication,The Rival Rochester. This is a source of opinion, commentary, and satire. Several a cappella groups play a prominent role in campus life. The YellowJackets competed on Season 3 of NBC's "The Sing-Off" during the fall 2011 season, finishing 7th nationwide. The Midnight Ramblers are the centerpiece of the university's admissions video Remember oUR Name. The University of Rochester is also home to its own radio station, WRUR.

Residences
The majority of undergraduate students at the university live and take classes on the River Campus. Underclassmen are generally required to live on campus while upperclassmen have the option to live off campus. Some graduate housing is provided by the university, but a significant number also live off campus. Housing is provided at multiple locations spread across several campuses.

River Campus
River Campus residences house primarily undergraduates, with some graduate students serving as Graduate Head Residents (GHRs). Residences include:

Fraternity Quadrangle consists of nine houses, including six fraternities (Alpha Delta Phi, Delta Kappa Epsilon, Psi Upsilon, Sigma Chi, Sigma Phi Epsilon, and Theta Chi); in addition, two special interest housing groups—the Douglass Leadership House and the Drama House—maintain housing here.
Freshman Housing - Consists of Susan B. Anthony Halls (Gannett, Gates, Hollister, and Morgan), near Rush Rhees Library, Hoeing Hall, Tiernan Hall, Gilbert Hall, and Lovejoy Hall which are on the Residence Quad. Freshmen live together in these specially designated residences that feature increased supervision, regulation, and residence-related activities by upperclassmen Dandelions (affectionately known as D'Lions) and Freshman Fellows, along with Residential Advisers in living areas.
Hill Court - Upperclass housing consisting of Chambers, Fairchild, Gale, Kendrick, Munro, and Slater houses, which are connected by tunnels. This residence area, opened in 1969, is colloquially known as "Phase" and was the newest residential area on the River Campus prior to the construction of the Riverview Complex.
Residence Quad (ResQuad) - Consists of Burton, Lovejoy, and Crosby Halls for upperclassmen, as well as Hoeing, Gilbert, Tiernan and Lovejoy Halls for freshmen. Burton and Crosby were the original dormitories on the River Campus, constructed in 1930, while the other four were built during the 1950s. All ResQuad buildings were fully renovated in the 1990s. (Lovejoy Hall is mostly upperclassmen but has included a freshman floor due to an increase in enrollment.)
River Campus Towers - Consists of O'Brien Hall, and Anderson and Wilder Towers. It houses upperclassmen and several Special Interest Housing groups. The formal name for the area is Jackson Court (formerly known as "Founders Court"), but it is simply called "Towers" by most students. Built in 1962, they are scheduled to undergo extensive renovations in the near future. O'Brien Hall opened up to students in 2012.
Southside - Southside consists of the Valentine and deKiewiet Towers, as well as several single-story house-style "maisonettes", which offer apartment-style living to upperclassmen. The residences are south of the River Campus near the medical center, but house River Campus undergraduate students. The campus master plan shows that this complex will eventually be razed.
Riverview - The only housing complex on the western side of the Genesee River, Riverview opened for the 2008–2009 school year, making it the first addition to the campus's housing in nearly 40 years. The complex consists of five buildings, which can house up to 400 undergraduates. The complex is made up of fully furnished two-to-four-person apartments.

Special Interest floors and Fraternity floors also exist within the residence halls. Special Interest Housing groups include Greenspace (Burton 1), Tiernan Project (Burton 2), Inter-Class Living Community (Crosby 1), Delta Upsilon (Wilder 3), Sigma Delta Tau (Wilder 4), Chi Omega (Wilder 5), Kappa Delta (Wilder 6), Music Interest Floor (Wilder 9), Computer Interest Floor (Anderson 3), Anime Interest Floor (Anderson 7), Phi Kappa Tau (Munro 1), Alpha Phi (Munro 2), Sigma Nu (Kendrick 1), Phi Sigma Sigma (Kendrick 2), Alpha Epsilon Pi (Gale 2), Delta Gamma (Fairchild 2), and Gamma Phi Beta (Fairchild 1).

Eastman School of Music Campus
Housing is provided at the Eastman School of Music campus at the Eastman Student Living Center at 100 Gibbs Street in downtown Rochester. The new building was opened in 1991 at the northeast corner of Main and Gibbs Streets, replacing the University Avenue dormitories built nearly 70 years earlier. It is a four-story quadrangle and 16-story tower surrounding a landscaped inner courtyard.

URMC and Mount Hope Campuses
Graduate student housing is provided at several locations near the URMC. These facilities also house select River Campus, non-traditional students who have been deemed too old for traditional housing.

George Washington Goler House (GHS) immediately adjacent to the grounds of the URMC. It is a high-rise apartment building with 321 apartments. The building also houses university community members, including faculty and staff.
University Park (UPK) is a complex of two-story buildings that include 40 studios, 86 one-bedroom, and 80 two-bedroom unfurnished apartments. UPK is near the URMC, directly across from Southside off of Kendrick Road. Graduate students and their families are the primary occupants of these apartments, but some non-traditional undergraduate students are housed here who have been deemed too old for traditional undergraduate housing on the River Campus. Students who live here typically take up residence year-round.

South Campus
The South Campus has graduate student housing at the Whipple Park (WPK) complex, which features 250 garden apartments and townhouses with ample storage space. WPK also features a park-like setting with large wooded and lawn areas, playgrounds, areas for gardens, and low street noise. Some housing is also provided at the River Road complex, which tends to serve as overflow housing for both undergraduate and graduate students.

Students' Association
The Students' Association (SA) is the primary student governing body and includes most of the student groups at UR. It is governed by the SA Senate, President and Vice President, all of whom are elected by the student body. The SA President may choose to appoint an advisory cabinet made up of a group of volunteer students. There is also a judicial branch, composed of the All Campus Judicial Council (ACJC), the members of whom are nominated by an interview committee and approved by the SA Senate. The SA Senate meets weekly and the longest meeting on record lasted longer than 8 hours. The offices of the SA are in the Wilson Commons student union.

All student groups are required to have a constitution, elected officers, and approval from the senate in order to be recognized by the SA and have access to university funds. These funds are given yearly based on budgets submitted to the Students' Association Appropriation Committee (SAAC) with supplemental funds available through special forms. All funds are derived from the mandatory Student Activities Fee.

Campus and area transportation

The UR campuses have their own University-sponsored system of buses, or shuttles, which provide free transportation from the River Campus to the Medical Center, South Campus, Eastman Campus, and Riverview. There are also lines that run between the River Campus and local shopping and entertainment in Henrietta and Pittsford. On the weekends, a shuttle loops to Rochester Public Market. Most of the university-sponsored buses are named using a color system (e.g. Red Line) that indicates their respective route and allows for easy identification. Several bus lines of the Rochester-Genesee Regional Transportation Authority (RTS) made stops at the University until 2020.

The university participates in the Zipcar program, which allows students to rent cars on an hourly or daily basis.

The Greater Rochester International Airport is a ten-minute drive to the west of the River Campus. In addition, Amtrak train and Greyhound bus have stations in downtown Rochester to the north of the campus. SA traditionally sponsors a free student shuttle to the airport, train station, and bus station for Thanksgiving and Spring Break.

Athletics

Rochester (UR) athletics teams are the Yellowjackets. The university is a member of the Division III of the National Collegiate Athletic Association (NCAA), primarily competing in dual membership with the University Athletic Association (UAA) and the Liberty League. One exception to this is the men's squash team, which is consistently ranked top 5 in the NCAA Division I ranks.

UR competes in 23 intercollegiate varsity sports: Men's sports include baseball, basketball, cross country, football, golf, soccer, squash, swimming & diving, tennis and track & field (indoor and outdoor); while women's sports include basketball, cross country, field hockey, lacrosse, rowing, soccer, softball, swimming & diving, tennis, track & field (indoor and outdoor) and volleyball.

Notes

Accomplishments

In 2009 women's soccer coach Terry Gurnett set records with over 400-lifetime wins. In March 2010 the women's basketball team made it to the NCAA's Final Four. The men's soccer team made it to the NCAA Elite Eight in 2017 and the NCAA Final Four in 2018.

Club/intramural sports
There are also numerous clubs and intramural athletics groups. Popular club sports include hockey, ultimate frisbee, rugby, and soccer, which all have men's and women's teams. The men's rugby team has enjoyed recent success, with a New York State Conference Championship in 2011. The team was ranked 9th in the nation out of 151 Division III teams for the 2011–2012 season.

Facilities
The main athletics facilities of the university are in the Robert B. Goergen Athletic Center and Fauver Stadium on the River Campus, with other facilities in the Spurrier building (River Campus) and the URMC.

Traditions
Rochester observes several traditional events throughout the year with diverse histories.

Formal academic events 
Convocation celebrates the start of the academic year and provides the opportunity for students, faculty, and staff to come together. The ceremony opens with a processional by faculty and administrators in traditional regalia, features a presentation of the Goergen Awards for contributions to undergraduate education, and incorporates welcome speeches from University officials and the SA President. The ceremony is typically followed by a picnic, student activities fair, and student performances.

Commencement is the formal end of the academic year. The university community gathers for a large ceremony at the Eastman Quadrangle. Members of the Board of Trustees, the President of the university, the President of the Senior Class, and a speaker selected by the administration offer remarks and advice. Degrees are then conferred at separate ceremonies by school and department.

University community weekends 
Yellowjacket Weekend directly follows Freshman Orientation. With the entire student body reunited, this weekend serves as the first official welcome to the Fall semester. Various musical groups or performers have headlined the festivities, including Aminé in Fall 2019 and Jason Derulo in a virtual Fall 2020 concert.

Meliora Weekend combines homecoming, class reunions, and family weekend. Events run from Thursday through Sunday and unite all campuses through common programming and events. The keynote is given each Saturday morning in Kodak Hall at the Eastman School. Past keynote speakers include Amartya Sen, Anderson Cooper, Stephen Colbert, Colin Powell, Sanjay Gupta, Bob Gates, Doris Kearns Goodwin, former President of the United States Bill Clinton, and former United States Secretary of Energy and University of Rochester alumnus Steven Chu.

Winterfest Weekend is the kickoff to the second semester and allows students to bask in the snowy Rochester winters. Highlights of the weekend include comedic performances (previous comedians include Demetri Martin, B. J. Novak, Michael Ian Black, and Pete Davidson), giveaways, sleigh rides, and ice skating.

Dandelion Day, colloquially known as D-Day, was a Saturday late in the spring semester established as an annual respite around final exams with extensive celebrations, recently accompanied by a carnival and musical guests. Previous years have featured Super Mash Bros., Reel Big Fish, Eve 6, Talib Kweli, Big Bad Voodoo Daddy, OK Go, AJR, and Rico Nasty. In 2012, D-Day was moved from Saturday to Friday and has since been rebranded as the start of Springfest Weekend in an effort by the administration to refocus the event from revelry and debauchery.

Boar's Head Feast 
In 1934, the men of the River Campus held the first Boar's Head Dinner. While the women of Prince Street moved to the River Campus in 1955, the event remained single-gender until 1971 when women joined the men in 17th-century garb. Today, student attendees have a semi-formal dress code, but the High Table (consisting of faculty, staff, the SA government branch heads, and Student Programming Board (SPB) executive board) still darns 17th century garb and takes on nobility titles for the night. This yearly feast was begun at Queen's College Oxford; the University of Rochester's variation on this theme includes performances by university a cappella, circus arts, and performance groups. The student body selects one faculty member each year to tell the story of the student and the boar. While each raconteur takes their own poetic liberties, the arc is the same: the wayward student in the forest defeats the boar with their calculus textbook. At the end of the dinner, a student group is awarded a boar's head for their significant contributions to campus life in the past year. The group is chosen by the previous year's winner.

Wilson Day 
Wilson Day, named for university benefactor Joseph C. Wilson, is a day of community service for all incoming university students which includes working on neighborhood picnics, voter registrations, painting, landscaping, meal service, and various other service efforts in the community.

First Year Spirit Week 
Every Spring Semester, the First Year Class Council plans and funds a week of first-year-only activities, giveaways, athletic events, and food. This week also includes the traditional I Heart UR Day, hosted by Alumni Relations, where students reflect on their community contributions, send messages to those who have helped shape the University community, and collect an I Heart UR shirt.

Senior Week 
Senior Week is an annual week of senior-only events leading up to Commencement Weekend. The week is planned and funded by the Senior Class Council and traditionally includes a picnic with the University President, a formal ball, a wine-tasting tour, graduation cap decoration, commencement rehearsal, and library tower tours.

Notable alumni and faculty

The University of Rochester has more than 120,000 alumni. Individuals affiliated with the university have earned prestigious honors in multiple disciplines. Thirteen graduates or faculty members have earned a Nobel Prize, and 13 have earned a Pulitzer Prize, while others have earned the highest honors awarded to Americans by the United States government. These include 9 recipients of the National Medal of Science (Arthur Kornberg, James V. Neel, Esther M. Conwell, Donald Henderson, John Prausnitz, Robert H. Dicke, John C. Slater, Victor Weisskopf, D. Allan Bromley), 4 recipients of the National Medal of Technology and Innovation (Alejandro Zaffaroni, Rangaswamy Srinivasan, Dace Viceps Madore, Maya Koster), 3 recipients of the National Medal of Arts (George Abbott, Anthony Hecht, Renée Fleming), and 3 recipients of the National Humanities Medal (Elizabeth Fox-Genovese, Evelyn Brooks Higginbotham, David A. Berry). Five members of the university community have been elected to the National Inventors Hall of Fame (Zaffaroni, Gary Starkweather, Lloyd Conover, Margaret Wu, Ching Wan Tang). The university community continues to influence scientific progress; for example, nearly a quarter of the scientists on NASA's advisory board for the James Webb Space Telescope are alumni or faculty members.

Rochester has had an impact on American higher education, counting among its alumni the former presidents of The University of Chicago, Massachusetts Institute of Technology, Tufts University, and the University of California, San Francisco, among others, and the deans of Harvard Medical School, Stanford University School of Medicine, UCSF School of Medicine, The University of Chicago Harris School of Public Policy Studies, and other graduate and professional schools. In total, the deans of four of the U.S. News & World Report top 10 medical schools were educated at Rochester. Ten percent of the university's undergraduates later earn a PhD.

Rochester graduates have been leaders in business. Notable alumni include Joseph C. Wilson, founder and CEO of Xerox; Barry Meyer, chairman and CEO of Warner Bros., and billionaires Paul Singer and Alan Zekelman. 

In addition, Rochester alumni have served in the United States Congress or held other senior government positions. These include Congressmen Sereno E. Payne, Jacob Sloat Fassett, and Samuel S. Stratton, Ambassadors Kenneth Keating and George F. Ward, and senior government officials Steven Chu, Vittorio Grilli, Lawrence Kudlow, and Donald C. Winter.

See also
George Eastman House
University of Rochester Arboretum

References

External links

 
 University of Rochester Athletics

 
1850 establishments in New York (state)
Educational institutions established in 1850
Genesee River
University of Rochester
Tourist attractions in Rochester, New York
Universities and colleges in Monroe County, New York